The Last Inch is a 1959 Soviet drama film directed by Nikita Kurikhin and Teodor Vulfovich. It is based on an  eponymous short story by James Aldridge published in the USSR in 1957, and in London in 1960.

Plot 
The film is about an unemployed  Ben Ensley,  a professional pilot, who decides to take dangerous underwater photographs to make money, and goes with his son Davy (who begged him to come along) to the distant Shark Bay. While taking the pictures, Ben gets bitten by a shark and bleeds heavily. The only chance for him to survive is to fly back to the small African town  they set off from.

Davy carries his  father into the plane and then follows his instructions to take off from the island and follow the route back. But the most complicated and dangerous part of the flight is the landing. Ben Ensley, who's half-conscious from loss of blood, instructs his son about the last inch that he must feel when landing a plane.

The last inch also references to the thin margin between life and death of the heroes.

Cast 
 Vladislav Muratov as Davy (as Slava Muratov)
 Nikolai Kryukov as Ben Ensley (voiced by  Yuri Tolubeyev)
 Mikhail Gluzsky as Gifford
 Aliagha Aghayev as cafe owner
 Mukhlis Jani-Zade as mechanic (voiced by  Sergey Yursky)
 Aleksey Rozanov as doctor

References

External links 
 

1958 films
1950s Russian-language films
Soviet drama films
1958 drama films
Films shot in Azerbaijan
Films based on American short stories
Russian aviation films
Films about shark attacks
Soviet adventure drama films
Lenfilm films